William Overton may refer to:
William Overton (judge) (1939–1987), United States district court judge
William Overton (Portland founder), founder of Portland, Oregon
William Overton (bishop) (1525–1609), bishop of Coventry and Lichfield
William Overton (cricketer) (1873–1949), English cricketer
Wil Overton, British artist, specialising in manga styles
William Whitey Overton (1928–2015), American steeplechaser and long distance runner